Debed FC, is a defunct Armenian football club from Alaverdi, Lori Province. Founded in 1938, Debed is one of the oldest football clubs in Armenia. However, the club was dissolved in early 1993 and is currently inactive from professional football.

League Record

References

Association football clubs established in 1938
Association football clubs disestablished in 2003
Defunct football clubs in Armenia
1938 establishments in Armenia
1993 disestablishments in Armenia